Treasure Island is a Soviet-Ukrainian, two-part, live-action/animated adventure comedy television film based on the 1883 novel with the same name by Robert Louis Stevenson. It was created by order of the USSR's state television company by the studio Kievnauchfilm. The film is mostly traditional animation with some live action sequences, which are largely but not entirely separate.

The first part, Captain Flint's Map, aired in 1986 and the second, Captain Flint's Treasure, in 1988, after which they were always shown together. The film attained a cult classic status almost immediately after release and has won the following awards: Grand Prize in Minsk, 1987; Grand Prize in Kyiv, 1989; 1st Prize on International Cinema Festival of Television films in Czechoslovakia.

A recut American version called The Return to Treasure Island was released direct-to-video in 1992. This version of the film is 34 minutes shorter (episodes with living actors were completely removed) than the Soviet version.

Plot 
Throughout the movie, characters are shown bios via introduction cards, which among other traits label them as "not married". Live-action songs are also played after certain scenes to present the audiences with morals about drugs and exercise.

Part one: Captain Flint's Map 
In live-action, Captain Flint, bearing a map of Treasure Island, defends himself from pirates who want to take it from him. He is soon killed, to which an animated Billy Bones takes the map.

Bones, who constantly drinks rum, arrives at the Admiral Benbow Inn on a stormy night and asks the innkeeper's son Jim Hawkins to let him know if he sees an old one-legged sailor, not knowing that a group of pirates is spying on them. The next day, they are visited by Bones's former shipmate Black Dog, who wants Bones to give him his map. Bones refuses, and a fight ensues. After Black Dog flees, Bones suffers a stroke. Dr. Livesey arrives and cheerfully examines him and warns that if he keeps drinking rum, he will die. They are later visited by a blind pirate known as Blind Pew, who gives Bones a black spot. Bones panics and soon dies due to apoplexy. Jim takes his map.

Blind Pew leads the group of spying pirates on a raid of the inn. Jim flees, and as the pirates do so too, Blind Pew accidentally falls into a barrel and rolls off a cliffside, falling to his death. Jim goes to Dr. Livesey's home, where he tells him and Squire Trelawney of what had happened and presents them with the map. Trelawney decides to assemble a hunt for the treasure, and the three travel to Bristol. At the Spyglass Inn, Jim gets into a fight with a hostile pirate before they are interrupted by the inn's owner, Long John Silver, who offers to bring his ship, the Hispaniola, and his crew on their treasure hunt.

Under the lead of Captain Smollett, the crew heads for the island. Jim overhears a gathering of Silver and his crew and finds out that he was Captain Flint's right-hand man and that they plan to betray the rest of the crew for the treasure.

Part two: Captain Flint's Treasure 
Jim sneaks back to Livesey and Trelawney to inform them of Silver's plan. Smollett proposes they play dumb for the time being, but they don't see that one of the pirates has spied on them and tells Silver that they know of their plans.

The next day, Treasure Island appears in the distance. Jim steals a rowboat and quickly rows there himself, with Silver and some men going after him. While hiding from them, he meets Ben Gunn, a former member of Flint's crew. He reveals that he and the rest of Flint's men were the ones who killed Flint after they decided to betray him for the treasure. Three years later, Ben led the other men on a search for Flint's treasure, but they found nothing and the crew left him marooned on the island. He agrees to help Jim and his friends find the treasure.

On the ship, Livesey examines the island with his telescope and sees Jim, Silver's crew, and an abandoned fortress. He, Trelawney, and Smollett steal a rowboat and head for the island, evading the pirates' cannon fire, and take refuge in the fort. Silver is informed of this and demands they surrender, but they refuse. A shootout ensues, and Jim and his allies ultimately win when Trelawney uses a fake cutout of a bar to trick the pirates into falling off a cliff.

That night, Ben and Livesey find the treasure together. Jim sneaks onto Silver's ship and fights Israel Hands before going back to the fort, where he is ultimately captured. Silver tells him that Livesey gave him the map and left with Smollett and Trelawney. They find the spot of the buried treasure in accordance to the map, but the treasure is not there due to Livesey and Ben having already taken it and the spot is actually a trap set up by Livesey, Smollett, and Trelawney. Livesey examines the pirates and tells them that their smoking is damaging their health, to which they drop dead. With Silver captured, his pirates defeated, and the treasure taken, the crew sets sail back to England.

The film ends with a showing of some of the animated main characters alongside their voice actors in live-action. After the credits, the live-action pirate crew finds the hidden treasure and opens it, only to find a spring-loaded sign saying the end.

Voice cast 
 Valeriy Bessarab as Jim Hawkins
 Armen Dzhigarkhanyan as Long John Silver
 Viktor Andriyenko as Captain Smollett and Billy Bones, one reply of John Silver
  as Dr. Livesey and "dossier" storyteller
 Borys Voznyuk as Squire Trelawney
 Yury Yakovlev as Ben Gunn
 Grigory Tolchinsky as Black Dog
 Heorhiy Kyshko as Blind Pew
 Volodymyr Bystryakov as the Blind Pew's dog
 Volodymyr Zadniprovskyy as the "cowardish pirate"

Cast 

 Instrumental ensemble VIA (ВИА) and theatre company "Grotesque":
 Valeriy Chyhlyayev as Leading Pirate/Captain Flint
 Yuri Nevganonny as Captain Flint in Ben Gunn's story
 Viktor Andriyenko
 Anatoly Dyachenko
 Vyacheslav Dubinin
 Mikhail Tserishenko
 Alexander Levit
 Vitali Vasilkov
 Semyon Grigoriev
 David Cherkassky
 Vladimir Chiglyayev
 Oleg Sheremenko

Background 
Treasure Island was a product of collaboration of two very well known people in the USSR: David Cherkassky, a director, who, at the time of inception, produced a number of very popular cartoons, and Radna Sakhaltuev, a cartoonist, who had a long and fruitful history of collaboration with Cherkassky, as well as a history of being a cartoonist for a number of satirical magazines in Kyiv, where he became well known for his distinctive style. Their previous collaborations yielded fruitful results, including the cartoons about the Adventures of Captain Wrongel (from a Russian "tall tales of the sea" kind of book) and Doctor Aybolit (a more children-centric cartoon). This built the duo a reputation that allowed some extra freedom during their future work, and this was fully exploited for the Treasure Island adaptation, which was very liberal as far as Soviet cartoons went.

A distinctive feature of the cartoon was the inclusion of live action "musical pauses" — songs performed by live actors that explained, for example, why it is a bad idea to drink alcohol or smoke, or why Jim Hawkins defeats all the pirates he meets (because he does exercises every morning). These scenes were added to help meet the deadline for the cartoon and were filmed at night.

While the subject matter was taken almost literally at times (the cartoon often quotes the original novel line-by-line), the approach towards screen adaptation was very lighthearted, as pirates were quite a distant reality for the Soviet Union. The pirates play obviously goofy roles, and the whole approach to violence is very cartoonish. The movie drew controversy in 2012, as Russia implemented a new law prohibiting showing movies that have scenes of alcohol consumption and smoking to minors. The film uses scenes of rum drinking and smoking among pirates excessively; however, at the same time, it stressed that because the villains had bad habits of drinking and smoking, while the heroes didn't, the heroes always won against all odds, as they were healthier. A public outcry over the fate of such beloved childhood classics as Treasure Island resulted in an adoption of a special exception that allowed the screening of "movies that have significant historical and cultural value", including Treasure Island, to be exempt from the law. The cartoon parodied a number of pre-1970's US cartoons, as well as a few Russian movies.

While the movie was shot in the USSR, because the home base for the animation studio behind the film was Kyiv, it features not so many actors of Soviet-wide fame in the voice cast; however, many people involved in voicing the parts of the cartoon were quite famous in Kyiv as theater actors, even though this recognition didn't necessarily translate to Soviet-wide fame.

Home video 
On 16 March 2006 the Russian DVD by Krupny Plan (Region 0) contains the original Russian edit of the film with restored images and a Dolby Digital 5.1 sound mix (as well as with the original mono sound). This version contains no bonus material, no subtitles and is Russian only.
 
In 2005 an export version of the Russian edit of the film by RUSCICO (Region 0) is available under the title Treasure Island. This version contains Russian (5.1 and 1.0), English and French (5.1 with one voice voiceover translation) soundtracks as well as several subtitle languages (English, French, German, Italian and Spanish). The picture was not restored for this edition. As a bonus feature, there are text infos about David Cherkassky.

The US direct-to-video cut from 1992 was published in USA under the title Return to Treasure Island on DVD (Region 1). The picture was not restored. However, the English audio has been remastered in 5.1. This edit of the film does not contain any Russian audio. The VHS edition was distributed by Video Treasures.

Legacy 
In 2005, Ukrainian game development studio Action Forms made the official PC adventure game Treasure Island. Director of the film David Cherkassky, as well as the original voice cast members Yevhen Paperny and Viktor Andriyenko and the animators and artists of former Kievnauchfilm, participated in development of the game.

In August 2022, the character Dr. Livesey became the subject of an international internet meme, in which his confident gait whilst entering the tavern with Jim and Trelawney is set to the phonk track "Why Not" by Ghostface Playa.

See also

Lists of animated feature films

References

External links 

 Treasure Island at Animator.ru
 
 
 
 
 
 
 
 
 

1988 television films
1980s adventure films
1980s Russian-language films
Animated films based on novels
Film and television memes
Films with live action and animation
Internet memes
Treasure Island (1988 film)
Kievnauchfilm films
Soviet animated television films
Treasure Island films
Soviet adventure comedy films
Comedy television films
1980s adventure comedy films
1980s comedy films